Sri Aurobindo College is a constituent college of the University of Delhi in India. It was established in year 1972, which was the birth centenary year of the philosopher, patriot-poet, Sri Aurobindo. The college is situated in South Delhi in Malviya Nagar, in the vicinity of Qutab Minar, Sri Aurobindo Ashram, IIT (Delhi), NCERT and Qutab Institutional Area.

The college is a constituent part of University of Delhi.

Recently in 2022 , this college completed its 50 years of establishment .

References

External links
 Sri Aurobindo College, Official website

Delhi University
Educational institutions established in 1972
1972 establishments in Delhi
South Delhi district